George Herbert Rogers (July 1820 – 12 February 1872), commonly known as G. H. Rogers, was an Australian stage actor.

Life and career

Rogers was born at St Albans, Hertfordshire, England, the son of Thomas Rogers, a surgeon, and brother of Henry Rogers, the essayist and author of The Eclipse of Faith. George Rogers, having quarrelled with his family, enlisted in the army and came to Hobart with his regiment in July 1839. Rogers was promoted corporal (and sergeant) and showing talent in regimental theatricals, had his discharge purchased by public subscription. Rogers was then employed as a civil officer in the convict department.

Rogers took to the stage and was playing with a local company when he was engaged by George Selth Coppin who was visiting Hobart. Rogers had been well-educated but he had had no formal training for the stage. Under Coppin's management he played in Australia's leading cities and by the beginning of 1848 had established a great reputation in old men's parts, although not yet 30 years of age. Rogers was for many years leading old man at the Theatre Royal, Melbourne. For a time Rogers drew a large salary but later fell into misfortune and was in poor health for the final two years before his death at Melbourne on 12 February 1872. He was married twice and was survived by sons and daughters, including the actress Frances Julia Rogers.

Rogers immersed himself in his parts and completely lost his individuality. He was as inimitable in burlesque as in serious drama, and played such diverse parts as the Widow Twankey in Aladdin, Falstaff, Antonio in The Merchant of Venice and Fagin in Oliver Twist. But his greatest triumphs were in old English comedy, and though possibly Lambert may have equalled his performance of Sir Anthony Absolute, Roger's Sir Peter Teazle stood alone on the Australian stage.
He was a member of the Melbourne Garrick Club.

References

1820 births
1872 deaths
Australian male stage actors
Australian male comedians
Australian people of English descent
19th-century Australian male actors
19th-century comedians